Fenercell is a virtual mobile network operator in Turkey. It is using the Avea network and is owned by the major multi-sport club Fenerbahçe.

"Avea" (A ve (and) A: Aria and Aycell) is one of three GSM operators in Turkey. It has been founded in 2004 with the merger of the two GSM operators Aycell (Türk Telekom) and Aria (joint venture of İş Bankası (51%) and TIM (49%)). TIM and Türk Telekom own 40% stake each and Is Bank Group holds 20%. In September 2006, Telecom Italia announces that, having received authorisation from the relevant Turkish authorities, the sale of 40.5% stake in Avea, held by subsidiary TIM International, to Türk Telekom, for a total of US$500 million, has been finalised. Therefore, the current shareholder structure is 81% owned by Türk Telekom and remaining 19% by İş Bankası. Its competitors, Turkcell and Vodafone Turkey, have both been founded in 1994 and use the GSM 900 frequency range while Avea uses the GSM 1800 range.

Coverage area 
The merging of two GSM operators has resulted in the need of redesigning the network architecture to extend coverage and to solve the issues created by the network load. Avea has been able to complete most of that process about one year after its creation, and currently covers a vast majority of Turkey's land area with more than 7000 base stations (A map can be found on The GSM World Web Page). In contrast to Turkcell and Vodafone, Avea doesn't have an extension in the Turkish Republic of Northern Cyprus and customers therefore roam on the Turkcell and Vodafone Turkey networks.

Being a merger of two networks, Avea suffers from the heterogeneity of roaming partners and customers with numbers beginning with 50 and 55 don't have the same list of roaming partners (see the list of roaming partners for 505 customers and the list of roaming partners for 555 customers for the different partners' lists). Avea also offers GPRS / EDGE / 3G roaming in multiple countries (see the list of GPRS roaming partners for 505 customers and the list of GPRS roaming partners for 555 customers).

Competitiveness 

As the latest participant in the Turkish GSM sector, Aria, Aycell and Avea have been obliged to offer lower prices to attract a maximum number of customers. Consequently, Turkcell (the leader of the Turkish GSM market) has lowered down its intra-network call rates by a third after the creation of Aria, and halved all call rates when Avea has been launched.

Currently, customers pay between 0 and 0.35 Turkish liras per minute for national calls and between 0.32 and 2.1 Turkish liras per minute for international calls (for details, see The Avea Tariffs Web site); which roughly corresponds to respectively 0, 0.20, 0.19 and 1.1 euros per minute. The very common SMS service costs between 0 and 0.06 Turkish liras per SMS for national SMS messages, and 0.21 Turkish liras for international ones (which corresponds to 0, 0.03 and 0.12 euros) (you can see the Avea Service Tariffs Web Site for details).

External links 
 Fenercell's web site
 Avea's web site
 GSM World

Telecommunications companies established in 2009
Companies based in Istanbul
Turkish brands
Fenerbahçe S.K.
Mobile virtual network operators